Marion Henriëtte Louise Molly (born 29 December 1933), known professionally as Milly Scott, is a Dutch singer and actress of Surinamese origin, best known for her participation in the Eurovision Song Contest 1966. She is recognised as the first black singer to take part in the Eurovision Song Contest.

Early life 
Scott was born in Den Helder, the main base of the Royal Netherlands Navy, where her father was stationed as a marine. Both her parents were immigrants from the Dutch colony of Surinam, while her paternal grandfather was originally from North Brabant. As the first black family in Den Helder and the only black child in kindergarten, she often experienced discrimination while growing up.

In the beginning of World War II, the ship HNLMS Johan Maurits van Nassau was bombed, severely wounding Scott's father, after which the family moved to Amsterdam. Soon after, her father was summoned by the Nazis and taken to Germany as a prisoner of war. The Red Cross later informed the family that he had died there.

Having learned to play the piano during the war, Scott started giving performances to financially support her mother after her father's death. At the age of 14, she began singing in amateur bands and was eventually given a scholarship to study at the conservatory in Amsterdam. However, she dropped out due to the intense racism and bullying she experienced during her studies.

Career

Early career 
In 1953, at the age of 19, Scott was asked by Dutch comedian Toon Hermans to perform in one of his shows. According to Hermans, the name Milly suited her better than her birth name Marion. Following her mother's advice not to use her real surname, she then came up with the stage name Milly Scott. After performing in front of a big audience for the first time, she quickly built up a career as a jazz singer, with Lou van Rees as her impresario.

Working as a singer, she lived in Hamburg, West Germany since 1954, and later moved to Sweden where she stayed for five years. In Gothenburg and Stockholm, she shared the stage with world-famous artists, such as Judy Garland and Quincy Jones. Furthermore, she maintained a close friendship with Swedish-Dutch singer Cornelis Vreeswijk, whom she regularly visited at his home in Lidingö.

Eurovision Song Contest 

Scott owes her successes in the Netherlands to the influential entertainment journalist Henk van der Meijden, who had found out about her career in Sweden and wrote an article about her in De Telegraaf. This led to numerous appearances on national television and she was even given her own television show in 1965, named Scott in de roos (after the phrase , meaning "bullseye").

In 1966, Scott was asked to participate in the Nationaal Songfestival, the Dutch national selection for the Eurovision Song Contest. She went on to win the national final with the song "Fernando en Filippo", written by Gerrit den Braber and composed by Kees de Bruyn. This gave her the right to represent the Netherlands in the eleventh edition of the Eurovision Song Contest, held in Luxembourg City. Her entry received a total of two points from the international juries, placing fifteenth out of eighteen songs.

Although "Fernando en Filippo" was something of a novelty song (and was also performed as such) at a time when ballads dominated in the competition, Scott would later claim that her disappointing result was attributable, at least in part, to racism on the part of the voting jurors.

After Eurovision 

Although Scott never produced any hit records, her jazz-based singing career brought her to Germany, Sweden and the United Kingdom in later years. She also branched out into acting and appeared in many theater and television shows, her best-known role being in the RTL 4 drama series Vrouwenvleugel (1993–95) in which she played Baby Miller, a prisoner trying to come to terms with her racial identity.

Discography

Extended plays 
1966 – "Fernando en Filippo"

Singles 
1958 – "Melodie d'amour" / "Africa"
1963 – "Up a Lazy River" / "Crawdad Song" (with The Beale Street Jazzband)
1963 – "Je hebt m'n leven stukgemaakt" / "Ik kus jouw ring"
1964 – "Kom huil dan" / "Ik moet verder"
1964 – "Zonder jou ben ik niets" / "Nee..."
1964 – "Hello Dolly" / "Hush-a-by Ma Baby"
1965 – "Als een kind" / "Zeg 's eerlijk"
1966 – "Fernando en Filippo (Tong-tiki-tong)" / "Graag of niet"
1966 – "Fernando en Filippo" / "Onvoltooide symfonie"
1966 – "Fernando y Felipe" / "Ya no me quieres"
1966 – "Fernando and Filippo" / "Don't Make a Fool of Me"
1966 – "Liefde smeult, liefde groeit, liefde bloeit, liefde stoeit" / "B.B. met R."
1966 – "Guantanamera" / "La Bamba"
1967 – "Who Cares" / "I'm Laughing Up the Sleeve"
1971 – "Get High on Jesus" / "Sunshine in My Rainy Day Mind"
1972 – "Spanish Harlem" / "Zeg hem dat de sneeuw valt"
1979 – "Pata Pata" / "I Was Just Like a Child"

As part of Milly & The Sisters Scott 
1965 – "Come Over to My Place" / "Silver Dollar"
1966 – "Baby, Did I Do You Right" / "St. Louis Blues"

Filmography

Film 
De vuurproef, 1968 – Tituba
The Fox and the Hound, 1981 – Big Mama (Dutch voice)

Television 
, 1976 – Juliette Chaffour's Maid
Vrouwenvleugel, 1995 (season 3; 22 episodes) – Baby Miller
Goede tijden, slechte tijden, 2005 (season 15; 3 episodes) – Dorothea

References

External links 

Official website

1933 births
Living people
People from Den Helder
Dutch women singers
Dutch people of Surinamese descent
Dutch television actresses
Eurovision Song Contest entrants of 1966
Eurovision Song Contest entrants for the Netherlands